Krasnodarsky (masculine), Krasnodarskaya (feminine), or Krasnodarskoye (neuter) may refer to:
Krasnodar Krai (Krasnodarsky krai), a federal subject of Russia
Krasnodarsky (rural locality) (Krasnodarskaya, Krasnodarskoye), name of several rural localities in Russia